Penyagalera is a rocky mountain in the northern side of the Ports de Tortosa-Beseit, Aragon, Spain. Punta de Penyagalera, the highest summit, has an altitude of 1,034.4 metres above sea level.

Penyagalera, the name of the mountain (penya "rock" and galera "galley" in Catalan) derives from the fact that it looks like a ship keel upwards from certain angles.

See also
Ports de Tortosa-Beseit
Mountains of Aragon
Iberian System

References

External links
Penyagalera - Excursions from Beseit 
Penyagalera - Toll del Vidre 

Ports de Tortosa-Beseit
Matarraña/Matarranya
One-thousanders of Spain